Natalia Nosek (born 20 April 1998) is a Polish handball player for ESBF Besançon and the Polish national team.

She participated at the 2016 European Women's Handball Championship.

References

1998 births
Living people
Polish female handball players
Sportspeople from Kraków
21st-century Polish women